Aleutia Computers Ltd. (pronounced al-oo-sha) is a privately owned computer manufacturer based in London, United Kingdom. Its product range consists of low-power desktop and server computers. Its products are used in the developing world and as original base designs for externally branded products. Its computers have been purchased by Unicef, Tesco, Schlumberger, Pret a Manger, Virgin Media, BAE Systems, and the National Health Service. All computers come with the option to ship a version of Ubuntu or Linux Mint, alongside the mainstream choice of Microsoft Windows.

History 
Aleutia was founded in London by Michael Rosenberg in October 2006, motivated by the unreliability, inefficiency, and expense of the Hewlett-Packard PCs in the internet cafe he had set up in Takoradi, Ghana in the summer of 2006.

Its first product was the E1, which was introduced for public sale in October 2007, was a fanless, low-power computer targeting the need for energy efficient computers in Africa. This was followed by the E2 in 2008 whose YouTube video attracted 2.3M views. 

In 2015, at Intel's Developer Forum in San Francisco, Aleutia launched its R50 Computer, a fanless Intel Core i5-based system with a unique hybrid enclosure of CNC machined copper and aluminium to maximize heat dissipation and enable computing in the most challenging environments. Aleutia also launched an off grid kiosk for charging tablets in African classrooms as well as a prefabricated Solar Classroom that was rolled out across Kenya. 

Aleutia was acquired by Captec, a manufacturer of industrial computers, in June 2019.

Clients 
Aleutia supplies the T1 computers used as point-of-sale servers in every Pret a Manger store in the United Kingdom, United States and Hong Kong running Omnico Hospitality software.

A project being run by the Uganda Communications Commission to provide ICT to all Ugandan schools has chosen the T1 over the Asus Eee due to the T1's fan-less design. According to the BBC, this has been rolled out to 137 schools in Uganda. 

The Ethiopia ConnectED project aimed to "build a solar-powered computer learning center that integrated the technology, theories of change, and pedagogical practices from the Hole-in-the-Wall, Education for All, and One Laptop Per Child initiatives." Aleutia supplied T1 PCs running Edubuntu, along with LED monitors, and solar kits.

Aleutia was the technology supplier to Varkey Foundation for its DFID-funded programme Making Ghanaian Girls Great, with distance learning enabled at 144 rural schools in rural Ghana. 

Aleutia supplied the hardware and "eClinic" software used on the ground by the "Access to Basic Care" (ABC) programme, which runs 12 healthcare clinics in Oyo State, Nigeria. 

Aleutia's computers were used in the Kakuma refugee camp in Kenya in 2017 in partnership with Crown Agents.

References

External links 
 

Computer companies established in 2006
Computer companies of the United Kingdom
Computer hardware companies
Linux-based devices
Nettop
Privately held companies of the United Kingdom